The 1995–96 Irish Cup was the 116th edition of Northern Ireland's premier football knock-out cup competition. It concluded on 4 May 1996 with the final.

Linfield were the defending champions after winning their 35th Irish Cup last season, with a 3–1 win over Carrick Rangers in the 1995 final. This season they reached the quarter-finals, but lost to 2–0 to Crusaders. Glentoran were the eventual cup winners, defeating Glenavon 1–0 in the final to win the cup for the 16th time.

Results

First round
The following teams were given byes into the second round: Ards Rangers, Bessbrook United, Cullybackey, Dungiven Celtic, Glebe Rangers, Larne Tech Old Boys, Laurelvale, Northern Telecom, Orangefield Old Boys, Portglenone, Saintfield United, Southend United and UUC.

|}

Replays

|}

Second round

|}

Replays

|}

Third round

|}

Replay

|}

Fourth round

|}

Replays

|}

Fifth round

|}

Sixth round

|}

Quarter-finals

|}

Semi-finals

|}

Replays

|}

Final

References

1995–96
1995–96 domestic association football cups
Cup